Pitcairnia amblyosperma is a species of flowering plant in the family Bromeliaceae, endemic to central and northeastern Mexico. It was first described by Lyman Bradford Smith in 1937.

References

amblyosperma
Endemic flora of Mexico
Plants described in 1937